YouGov is a British international Internet-based market research and data analytics firm, headquartered in the UK, with operations in Europe, North America, the Middle East and Asia-Pacific. In 2007, it acquired US company Polimetrix, and since December 2017 it has owned Galaxy Research, an Australian market research company.

History
YouGov was founded in the UK in May 2000 by Stephan Shakespeare and future UK Chancellor of the Exchequer Nadhim Zahawi. In 2001 they engaged BBC political analyst Peter Kellner, who became chairman, and then from 2007 to 2016, President.

In April 2005, YouGov became a public company listed on the Alternative Investment Market of the London Stock Exchange.

In 2007, polling firm Polimetrix, headed by Stanford University professor Doug Rivers,
was acquired by the company.

Galaxy Research
Galaxy Research was an Australian market researching company that provided opinion polling for state and federal politics. Its polls were published in News Limited tabloid newspapers, including the Herald Sun, Courier-Mail and The Daily Telegraph (in contrast to Newspoll data which is presented in the News Limited broadsheet newspaper The Australian).

In December 2017, YouGov purchased Galaxy Research to establish presence in Australia.

Description and governance
Stephan Shakespeare has been YouGov's Chief Executive Officer since 2010. Roger Parry has been YouGov's Chairman since 2007. Since Peter Kellner's retirement as chair in 2016, its methodology has been overseen by Doug Rivers, former owner of Polimetrix.

, major shareholders of the company included Liontrust Asset Management (14.23%); Standard Life Aberdeen (8.6%); Octopus Investments (7.78%); BlackRock (7.63%); and Stephan & Rosamund Shakespeare (6.85%).

YouGov is a member of the British Polling Council.

Methodology
YouGov specialises in market research and opinion polling through online methods. The company's methodology involves obtaining responses from an invited group of Internet users, and then weighting these responses in line with demographic information. It draws these demographically representative samples from a panel of over 12 million people worldwide.

Expansions
In 2006, YouGov began expanding outside the UK through acquisitions and acquired Dubai-based research firm Siraj for $1.2 million plus an eventual earn out of $600,000. In 2007, they added Palo Alto, CA based US research firm Polimetrix for approximately $17 million, Scandinavian firm Zapera for $8 million and German firm Psychonomics for $20 million. In 2009 and 2010, YouGov expanded its US operations with two acquisitions; first buying Princeton, NJ research firm Clear Horizons for $600,000 plus an earn out of $2.7 million, then Connecticut-based research firm Harrison Group for $6 million with a $7 million earnout. In 2011, YouGov acquired Portland, OR-based firm Definitive Insights for $1 million with a potential $2 million earn out. In 2011, YouGov made its first organic expansion by opening an office in Paris, France. In January 2014, YouGov entered the Asia Pacific region with the acquisition of Decision Fuel for an estimated consideration of approximately £5 million.

In 2010, YouGov bought a 20% stake of sports media data company SMG Insight. In 2018, the company acquired the remaining 80% of SMG Insight's stock. The new business was rebranded YouGov Sport.

Allegations of poll manipulation 
In June 2022, former employee Chris Curtis, who at this time worked for competitor Opinium, said that during the 2017 United Kingdom general election, a YouGov poll was suppressed by the company because it was "too positive about Labour", under pressure from the Conservative co-founder of YouGov Nadhim Zahawi. YouGov denied that the poll was spiked for political reasons, instead arguing that the poll was based on a "skewed sample". Former YouGov president Peter Kellner confirmed last-minute small methodology changes which transferred 2% from Labour to Conservative and increased the predicted Conservative lead from 3% to 7%.

A day later, Curtis withdrew his allegations, saying that he now accepted "YouGov's position that in fact the results were pulled because of concerns other members of the team had about the methodology", and that he had not intended to allege that Nadhim Zahawi had had any bearing on the decision, and apologised for any confusion caused by his previous statements.

See also

Australia
 Essential Media Communications
 Newspoll
 Opinion polling for the 2022 Australian federal election
 Roy Morgan Research

United Kingdom
 Opinion polling for UK general elections: 2005, 2010, 2015, 2017, 2019, Next 
 Opinion polling for the 2014 Scottish independence referendum

United States
 Nationwide opinion polling for the 2012 United States presidential election
 Statewide opinion polling for the 2012 United States presidential election

References

External links

Service companies of the United Kingdom
Public opinion research companies
British companies established in 2000
Market research companies of the United Kingdom
Companies listed on the London Stock Exchange
Online research methods
Companies based in London
2000 establishments in the United Kingdom
2007 mergers and acquisitions
2017 mergers and acquisitions
Polling organisations in the United Kingdom
Opinion polling in Australia